Numismatic charms are coin-like amulets and talismans from various cultures, which include:

 Chinese numismatic charms
 Japanese numismatic charms
 Korean numismatic charms
 Vietnamese numismatic charms
 Indonesian numismatic charms
 Buddhist coin charms
 Confucian coin charms
 Taoist coin charms
 Horse coins
 Lei Ting curse charms
 Lock charms
 Open-work charms
 Hongwu Tongbaos
 Coin-swords